José Antonio González Caviedes (28 November 1938 – 4 December 1996) was a Spanish politician.  He was mayor of the small town of Olmedo, and later served as People's Party senator for Valladolid from 1989 until his death in 1996.

He died after suffering a heart attack whilst driving, which caused his car (a Mercedes Benz 300-TD) to collide with a lorry.

Personal life
González Caviedes was married and had three children. His daughter Miriam González Durántez is married to the British politician leader of the Liberal Democrats and former Deputy Prime Minister Nick Clegg.

References

See also
Politics of Spain

1938 births
1996 deaths
Members of the Senate of Spain
Mayors of places in Castile and León
People's Party (Spain) politicians
Road incident deaths in Spain